Tiskūnai (formerly ) is a village in Kėdainiai district municipality, in Kaunas County, in central Lithuania. According to the 2011 census, the village had a population of 427 people. There is a library, a former school, a community house, an ostrich farm.

History
An ancient stone axe has been found in Tiskūnai. The village developed during the Soviet era, when it became a center of the "Rised Sod" kolkhoz.

Demography

Images

References

Villages in Kaunas County
Kėdainiai District Municipality